Julie Richardson (born 30 March 1967) is a former professional tennis player from New Zealand. She won seven doubles titles during her career.

WTA career finals

Doubles: 14 (7 titles, 2 runner-ups)

ITF finals

Singles (4–4)

Doubles (16–4)

References

External links
 
 
 

1967 births
Living people
New Zealand female tennis players
People from Issaquah, Washington
Place of birth missing (living people)
Sportspeople from King County, Washington